Myrtle McGrain (July 8, 1883 – May 17, 1980) was an American stage actress and model in the first decade of the twentieth century.

Early life 
Myrtle McGrain was born in Kentucky, the daughter of Daniel G. McGrain and Delila E. Blume McGrain.

Career 
McGrain was a stage actress, appearing with the company of Joseph Jefferson in 1901 and 1902. She was seen on Broadway in musicals Babes in Toyland (1903), The Cingalee (1904) and Sergeant Brue (1905-1906). She toured with a stock company in the American South in 1907. The following year, she was the leading lady for Mitchell's All-Star Players, another stock company. She modeled for photographs that appeared in The Burr McIntosh Monthly.

Personal life 
In 1915, Myrtle McGrain married Lieutenant Colonel William J. Bacon. She was widowed when he died in 1950. She died in 1980, aged 96 years, in Florida. Her gravesite is in Memphis, Tennessee.

References

External links 

 
 
 "Myrtle McGrain Bacon, Broadway Actress, Model and Wife" Dead Memphis Walking (October 12, 2013). A blogpost about McGrain.

1883 births
1980 deaths
American actresses
People from Memphis, Tennessee